Pipe Makers Canal is a stream in the U.S. state of Georgia.

According to tradition, the stream was so named from an incident when Native Americans and Indian officials passed the peace pipe here. A variant name is "Pipe Maker's Creek".

References

Rivers of Georgia (U.S. state)
Rivers of Chatham County, Georgia